The Chain Bridge in Newburyport, Massachusetts, is a "look-alike" replica built in 1910 to replace the "first suspension bridge" constructed in the United States in 1810. Since the current structure is one of a series of bridges at this location since 1793, it is "the oldest continually occupied, long span, bridge crossing" in the US. It has also been called the Essex-Merrimac Bridge or Newburyport Chain Bridge.

It is a 225-foot chain bridge, a single-span suspension bridge, which crosses the right branch of the Merrimack River as it flows around Deer Island. The boundary between the cities of Newburyport and Amesbury, Massachusetts, runs through Deer Island, so Chain Bridge connects the two communities. Crossing from the island to the left bank of the Merrimack requires traversing the Derek S. Hines Memorial Bridge, formerly the Essex-Merrimack Drawbridge, which was reconstructed and reopened in August 2012. As the Chain Bridge is better known because of its structure, it is sometimes incorrectly identified as a single bridge spanning the Merrimack.

History

The first timber-arch truss bridge was constructed in 1792 to designs by Timothy Palmer, a local architect, using an arch he designed to mimic stone voussoir construction in wood, which he patented as "Palmer's arch". The cost was more than $36,000, and the bridge charged tolls. It was deemed unsafe in 1809, and the timber was auctioned. 

It was replaced in 1810 by a wrought-iron chain suspension bridge. James Finley, a Pennsylvania engineer, patented the chain construction in 1808. Using his designs, he built a bridge, since destroyed, over the Schuylkill River that year. This bridge operated as a toll bridge until 1868, when it was purchased by Essex County and opened to public access without charge. Scientific American reported in 1896 that it was "the solitary specimen in New England of a style of suspension bridge that has served its intentions admirably, and may still be found preferable to the wire bridges under certain circumstances".

This was replaced by the current span, which was completed in 1910 at the site of the two earlier bridges. The construction materials were almost entirely new. It is still referred to as "Chain Bridge", and its predecessor as "Old Chain Bridge".

The Chain Bridge is the only suspension bridge currently maintained by the Massachusetts Department of Transportation. In 1990 the bridge was part of a statewide survey as part of the Massachusetts Historic Bridge Recording Project. It has undergone several renovations, most recently in 2003.

Notes

References

External links
"Old Chain Bridge", postcard image, 1900, Museum of Fine Arts, Boston 
 "Old Chain Bridge", postcard image, 1906, New York Public Library

Bridges in Essex County, Massachusetts
Suspension bridges in the United States
Bridges over the Merrimack River
Chain bridges
Towers in Massachusetts